The North Face is an American outdoor recreation products company. The North Face produces outdoor clothing, footwear, and related equipment. Founded in 1966 to supply climbers, the company's logo draws inspiration from Half Dome, in Yosemite National Park. By the late 1990s, the label had expanded beyond outdoor enthusiasts by focusing on street couture and since the 2000s it is regarded as a streetwear style symbol label. In 2000, it was bought by VF Corporation.

History 
The North Face began in 1966 as a climbing equipment retail store in San Francisco, founded by Douglas Tompkins and his wife, Susie Tompkins. It was acquired two years later by Kenneth "Hap" Klopp.

The North Face takes its company logo from a stylised drawing of Half Dome, in Yosemite National Park.

In 2000, The North Face was acquired by VF Corporation in a deal worth US$25.4 million and became a wholly owned subsidiary.

The company was previously headquartered in Alameda, California, co-located with its corporate sibling, JanSport. In 2020, the company's headquarters relocated to Denver, Colorado.

Fashion 
By 1997, purchasers of North Face attire had expanded beyond those looking for technical clothing for skiing, climbing, and other outdoor pursuits to rappers in New York City, but remained only a small part of the company's business.

In 2005, wearers of the North Face attire became the targets of robbery in Prince George's County, Maryland. A similar trend occurred in South Korea in the early 2010s where it became a status symbol, resulting in children being bullied or having their North Face apparel stolen.

Controversies

South Butt 
In December 2008, The North Face filed a lawsuit in the United States District Court for the Eastern District of Missouri against The South Butt, its creator James A. Winkelmann Jr., and a company that handled the firm's marketing and manufacturing. In the legal action, The North Face alleged trademark infringement and sought injunctive relief. After the court ordered mediation in the case, the parties reached a closed settlement agreement on April 1, 2010; however, in October 2012, Winkelmann admitted in court that he and his father violated the settlement agreement with The North Face and agreed to pay US$65,000, an amount that will be reduced by US$1,000 for every month of compliance.

Wikipedia edits 
In May 2019, Leo Burnett Tailor Made, a marketing agency for The North Face Brazil, revealed that they had surreptitiously replaced photos of popular outdoor destinations on Wikipedia with photos featuring persons wearing North Face products in an attempt to get these products to appear more prominently in search engine results. Following widespread media coverage and criticism from the Wikimedia Foundation, The North Face apologized for the campaign, ended it, and the product placement was undone.

Credential stuffing attack 
A credential stuffing attack against The North Face's website began on July 26, 2022. However, the administrators of the website discovered the "unusual activity" on August 11 and were able to stop it by August 19. The breach compromised 194,905 customer accounts.

See also 

 List of outdoor industry parent companies

References

External links 

 
 VF Corporation
 Biography of Hap Klopp, founder of The North Face (archived)

1968 establishments in California
2000 mergers and acquisitions
2000s fashion
2010s fashion
American companies established in 1968
Camping equipment manufacturers
Clothing brands of the United States
Clothing companies established in 1966
Companies that filed for Chapter 11 bankruptcy in 1993
Companies based in Denver
Climbing and mountaineering equipment companies
Outdoor clothing brands
Shoe companies of the United States
Sportswear brands
VF Corporation